Fernando Zárate Salgado (born 16 August 1979) is a Mexican politician. As of 2012 he served as Deputy of the LXII Legislature of the Mexican Congress representing the Federal District.

He served as Secretary of the International and Foreign Affairs Committee, and member of the Constitutional Reforms and Justice Committee.

As President of the Special Gaming Committee, he denounced corruption cases regarding licenses of casinos in Mexico by the cabinet of Felipe Claderon Hinojosa (President of Mexico 2006–2012). He filed the new legislative piece of gaming and casinos, reforming the existing one of 1948, approved by the lower House.

He was the first legislator to file and succeed in the approval of imposing taxes to soft drinks, sugar beverages, and junk food. Mexico is the first country in the world to approve such a legislative measure, which made an example to the rest of LatinAmerica, and started to file legislative bills to prevent obesity.

In March 2015, after denouncing corruption  cases within the PRD, and foreseeing that the left wing party was going to lose the intermediate election, he resigned to the political party. He was the target of a political and media attack in May 2015, while seeking a local representative position within PRI/PVEM (Partido Revolucionario Institucional) launched by his former political party, while defending property and freedom of expression rights of an indigenous community.

Elected Congressman in Mexico City for the VII legislature 2015–2018, he was appointed Chairman of the Metropolitan Area Committee.

Due to the excessive exploitation, excessive and illegal use of urban areas by some of the top construction companies in Mexico, he deepened the criticism and made it public cases of corruption and illegal use of power, filing criminal and Human Rights cases against the Mayor of Mexico City, Miguel Angel Mancera, members of his cabinet, and other elected governors (chiefs of four boroughs), creating a political moment where the opposition capitalized beating the government and the ruling party in the 2018 election.

He served as Chairman of Mexico's City Congress in 2018. During his presidency Mexico's City law of reconstruction was discussed and voted, solving a six-month lockdown of economic support and reconstruction gap of the victims of the 7.1 (Richter scale) 2017 earthquake.

References

1979 births
Living people
People from Mexico City
Members of the Chamber of Deputies (Mexico) for Mexico City
Party of the Democratic Revolution politicians
Ecologist Green Party of Mexico politicians
21st-century Mexican politicians
Deputies of the LXII Legislature of Mexico